Porky's Badtime Story is a 1937 Warner Bros. Looney Tunes cartoon directed by Robert Clampett (his first short as director) and an uncredited Chuck Jones. The short was released on July 24, 1937, and stars Porky Pig and Gabby Goat. The short was later remade as Tick Tock Tuckered (1944), with Daffy Duck taking Gabby's role.

Despite being the first cartoon directed by Bob Clampett, the short could have been started by Ub Iwerks (with the first two, Porky and Gabby and Porky's Super Service fully completed by Iwerks) and finished by Clampett, alongside Get Rich Quick Porky. Clampett would direct Rover's Rival without any involvement with Iwerks, which would go on to release later that year.

Plot
When Porky Pig and Gabby Goat realize that they overslept to 10:00 after their alarm goes off at 06:00, they end up rushing to work at Peter Piper Pickled Peppers and sneaking in. When clocking in, Gabby tries to pull the lever, but ends up struggling and the clock goes crazy. Their boss catches them and initially states in a friendly tone that if they weren't going to make it, he would have sent their work to them. The boss then drops the friendly act and gets furious, warning them that if they are late one more time, they are fired. The boss then orders them to get to work.

At 08:00 that night after returning home from work and dealing with their irate boss, Porky sets the alarm clock as Gabby complains about having to go to bed early. Porky reminds Gabby about their boss' threat that if they are late again, they will be fired. Porky climbs into bed, and they both fall asleep until a bunch of cats next door wake them up; and later a fly bugs them, literally. Later that night, the moon comes out and its light wakes up Porky. One of Porky's attempts to close the window ends up wrecking his bed. As the night progresses, a thunderstorm occurs while Porky is sleeping in Gabby's bed. A leak in the roof disturbs Gabby, who then opens an umbrella in the house with Porky telling him that it's bad luck. Gabby ignores Porky's statement until lightning destroys the umbrella. When Gabby quips that he should try sleeping under Niagara Falls, a lot of water comes through the roof and down on them.

The next morning, Porky and Gabby are shown sleeping in the drawers when the alarm clock goes off at 06:00. They get themselves ready and drive off to work to make sure their jobs stay safe from termination. When Porky and Gabby arrive at Peter Piper Pickled Peppers, they see a sign on the door that says "Closed Sunday", revealing that their workplace is closed for the day. Porky and Gabby drive home, and when they climb back into the drawers to sleep, the alarm clock goes off again at 06:15 and Porky hits it with a mallet, leaving the clock dazed.

Legacy 
Bob Clampett later directed a remake of the short as Tick Tock Tuckered (1944), with Daffy Duck taking Gabby's role.

References

External links
 
 Porky's Badtime Story (Colorized) on the Internet Archive

Looney Tunes shorts
1937 films
1937 animated films
1930s American animated films
American black-and-white films
Films directed by Bob Clampett
Porky Pig films